Muscodor albus (frequently spelled "muscador albus") is a plant-dwelling fungus in the family Xylariaceae. It was first discovered in the bark of a cinnamon tree in Honduras. It has the ability to produce a mixture of volatile compounds, including alcohols and esters, which can kill pathogens like molds and bacteria such as listeria and salmonella and many plant pathogens. It also acts as an insecticide, killing potato tuber moths, codling moths and their larvae.

Researchers at the Agricultural Research Service investigated the antimicrobial effects of Muscodor albus on Botrytis cinerea, which causes the common grey mold found on table grapes.  Researchers found that Muscodor albus reduces the occurrence of Botrytis cinerea up to 85% on table grapes.  Utilizing Muscodor albus''' antimicrobial effects is ideal for organic farmers who suffer a loss in yield due to the grey mold, which is usually treated with sulfur dioxide.
Other isolates considered to be varieties of M. albus have been identified in Thailand, on Myristica fragrans, and in Australia's Northern Territory, on plants such as  Grevillea pterifolia (fern-leafed grevillea), Kennedia nigriscans (snakevine) and Terminalia prostrata (nanka bakarra).

References
General
AgraQuest asks EPA to OK mold-killer Sacramento Business Journal'',  Monday, August 11, 2003
Scientists Pit Fungus Against Potato Pest by Jan Suszkiw, United States Department of Agriculture Agricultural Research Service, May 15, 2007
Muscodor albus QST 20799 (006503) Fact Sheet; United States Environmental Protection Agency factsheet, issued 09/17/05
New endophytic isolates of Muscodor albus, a volatile-antibiotic-producing fungus
Specific

Xylariales
Fungi of North America